Miran Gašperšič (born 22 October 1948) is a Slovenian alpine skier. He competed in two events at the 1976 Winter Olympics, representing Yugoslavia.

References

1948 births
Living people
Slovenian male alpine skiers
Olympic alpine skiers of Yugoslavia
Alpine skiers at the 1976 Winter Olympics
Sportspeople from Jesenice, Jesenice